Mads Timm (born 31 October 1984) is a Danish footballer who plays as a forward for Danish Serie 1 club Kerteminde Boldklub.

Playing career
Spending his youth years at Odense, Timm joined English club Manchester United in the Premier League in 2000. He made his first team debut in a Champions League group stage defeat against Maccabi Haifa in October 2002. He was not able to secure a place in the first team at United, and he spent some time on loan at Norwegian club Viking, scoring the first ever goal at their new Viking Stadion, as well as at English Football League club Walsall, where he scored once against Chesterfield.

In March 2005, Timm was sentenced to 12 months in a young offenders' institute for dangerous driving, after teammate Callum Flanagan's car hit another vehicle while he and Timm were racing each other on a public road. Although United sacked Flanagan after the incident, Timm was allowed to remain with the club.

On 24 May 2006, Manchester United released a statement saying that Timm, along with six other players, had been released by the club, and on 1 June 2006, Timm returned to his Danish childhood club Odense on a three-year contract. In an interview on the Danish television station TV2, the coach from Odense stated that Timm needed a second chance.

Timm had some success at Odense, and he was called up to the Danish national team. However, he failed to keep his place in the Odense side, and he was released from the club on 15 August 2008 by mutual consent. On 25 August 2008, Lyngby Boldklub announced that they had signed a one-year contract with Timm.

On 16 August 2009, he retired from professional football because of injuries and lack of motivation. In 2011, he restarted his professional career with Danish football club Kerteminde.

References

External links
 Profile at ob.dk
 Profile at dbu.dk
 Career statistics at Danmarks Radio

1984 births
Living people
Footballers from Odense
Danish men's footballers
Denmark youth international footballers
Danish expatriate men's footballers
Association football forwards
Odense Boldklub players
Danish Superliga players
Manchester United F.C. players
Viking FK players
Lyn Fotball players
Walsall F.C. players
Lyngby Boldklub players
Expatriate footballers in Norway
Expatriate footballers in England
Danish expatriate sportspeople in Norway
Danish expatriate sportspeople in England
English Football League players
Eliteserien players
Sportspeople convicted of crimes